River Bend is a town in Craven County, North Carolina, United States. The population was 3,119 as of the 2010 Census. It is part of the New Bern, North Carolina Metropolitan Statistical Area.

Geography
River Bend is located at  (35.074324, -77.148519).

Demographics

2020 census

As of the 2020 United States census, there were 2,902 people, 1,376 households, and 957 families residing in the town.

2000 census
As of the census of 2000, there were 2,923 people, 1,343 households, and 988 families residing in the town. The population density was 1,147.1 people per square mile (442.6/km). There were 1,477 housing units at an average density of 579.6 per square mile (223.6/km). The racial makeup of the town was 93.29% White, 5.71% African American, 0.10% Native American, 0.38% Asian, 0.07% Pacific Islander, 0.03% from other races, and 0.41% from two or more races. Hispanic or Latino of any race were 1.03% of the population.

There were 1,343 households, out of which 15.0% had children under the age of 18 living with them, 68.3% were married couples living together, 4.6% had a female householder with no husband present, and 26.4% were non-families. 23.2% of all households were made up of individuals, and 12.2% had someone living alone who was 65 years of age or older. The average household size was 2.08 and the average family size was 2.40.

In the town, the population was spread out, with 14.0% under the age of 18, 3.6% from 18 to 24, 18.4% from 25 to 44, 27.1% from 45 to 64, and 36.9% who were 65 years of age or older. The median age was 57 years. For every 100 females, there were 92.4 males. For every 100 females age 18 and over, there were 89.8 males.

The median income for a household in the town was $49,851, and the median income for a family was $54,316. Males had a median income of $44,602 versus $37,500 for females. The per capita income for the town was $27,990. About 0.4% of families and 2.3% of the population were below the poverty line, including 4.0% of those under age 18 and 1.0% of those age 65 or over.

References

External links
 

New Bern micropolitan area
Populated places on the Trent River (North Carolina)
Towns in Craven County, North Carolina
Towns in North Carolina